Cissy van Bennekom (alternate spellings: Ciccy v. Bennekom and Cissij van Bennekom) was a Dutch comedy actress.  She was born in Haarlem in the Netherlands on 11 July 1911 and died of natural causes on 1 March 2005 in Amsterdam.

Filmography
 The Tars, (1934)
 De Jantjes (1934)
 Op Hoop van Zegen, (1934)
 De Familie van mijn Vrouw, (1935)
 De Vier Mullers, (1935)
 T' was een April, (1935)
 Op een Avond in Mei, (1936)
 
 De Spooktrein, (1939)

References

External links

1911 births
2005 deaths
Dutch film actresses
People from Haarlem
20th-century Dutch actresses